"Per tutta la vita" is the third single by Italian singer Noemi. The song participated in the 60th Sanremo Music Festival, competing in the section "Artisti".

It was written by Diego Calvetti and Marco Ciappelli, and produced by Diego Calvetti. On 24 May 2010, Noemi received a Wind Music Award for "Per tutta la vita". In March 2010, "Per tutta la vita" was certified Platinum by the Federation of the Italian Music Industry.

Track listing
Digital download

Music video
The music video produced for "Per tutta la vita" was directed by Gaetano Morbioli.

Charts

Peak position

Year-end chart

References

2010 singles
Noemi (singer) songs
Number-one singles in Italy
Rhythm and blues ballads
Soul songs
Italian-language songs
Sanremo Music Festival songs
Songs written by Diego Calvetti
Songs written by Marco Ciappelli
Sony Music singles
2010 songs